Solen glimmar blank och trind (The sun gleams smooth and round) is Epistle No. 48 in the Swedish poet and performer Carl Michael Bellman's 1790 song collection, Fredman's Epistles. The Epistle is subtitled "Hvaruti afmålas Ulla Winblads hemresa från Hessingen i Mälaren en sommarmorgon 1769" ("In which is depicted Ulla Winblad's journey home from Hessingen"). One of his best-known and best-loved works, it depicts an early morning on Lake Mälaren, as the Rococo muse Ulla Winblad sails back home to Stockholm after a night spent partying on the lake. The composition is one of Bellman's two Bacchanalian lake-journeys, along with epistle 25 ("Blåsen nu alla"), representing a venture into a social realism style. 

Places along the route can be identified from Bellman's descriptions. The work has been called a masterpiece, with its freshness compared to Elias Martin's paintings, its detail to William Hogarth's, its delicacy to Watteau's, building up "an incomparable panorama" of 18th century Stockholm. The Epistle, alone among Bellman's works, is often sung in Swedish schools.

Context 

Bellman wrote the first draft of Epistle 48 early in 1772, apparently while at work, as it is penned on a sheet of ready-lined record paper of his employer the General Directorate of Customs.

Song

Music 

The song is in the key of C, in  time. It has 21 verses, each consisting of eight lines. The rhyming pattern is ABAB-CCCB; the song was written in February 1772. It has a "gay dancing melody", which along with the poem gives the listener 

The melody was a favourite of Bellman's, and is of French origin, where it had been used by Antoine de Bourbon. It is found in Joseph de La Font's 1714 opéra-ballet Fêtes de Thalie, the music composed by Jean-Joseph Mouret under the name of "Le Cotillon". This may not have been where Bellman obtained the melody, as it was, the musicologist James Massengale writes, evidently a popular tune at that time, known by many different names ("timbres"). Bellman knew it as "Si le roy m'avoit donné", and set his song "Uppå vattnets lugna våg" in the 1783 edition of Bacchi Tempel, and his poem "Ur en tunn och ljusblå sky", to the same tune.

Lyrics 

The Epistle paints a charming picture of an early morning on Lake Mälaren, as the Rococo muse Ulla Winblad sails back home to Stockholm. The song brings in Movitz the cellist, another of Bellman's stock characters in Fredman's Epistles, based on one of his friends.

The song tells the story of a boat on the way home after a night out on the island-studded lake. In the boat are the peasant girl Marjo, a tub of butter on her knees, with a cargo of the birch-sprigs that Stockholmers used to decorate their town with as a sign of returning spring, milk, and lambs; and her father, puffing his pipe self-importantly at the helm. It begins:

Places mentioned 

The song is descriptively subtitled "Hvaruti afmålas Ulla Winblads hemresa från Hessingen i Mälaren en sommarmorgon 1769" ("In which is depicted Ulla Winblad's journey home from Hessingen in Lake Mälaren"). A series of places that can be seen from that waterway are mentioned in the text:

Reception and legacy

Bellman's biographer, the translator Paul Britten Austin calls the poem a masterpiece and "one of Bellman's greatest. At a stroke he created in Swedish poetry a new vision of the natural and urban scene. Fresh as Martin's. Detailed as Hogarth's. Frail and ethereal as Watteau's." While each verse paints a "finely etched picture", he argues that all together they "build up to an incomparable panorama of that eighteenth-century Stockholm which meets us in Elias Martin's canvasses".  Britten Austin writes that

Britten Austin explains: "Everything occurs with apparent haphazardness. Yet each stanza is a little picture, framed by its melody. We remember it all, seem to have lived through it, like a morning in our own lives."

The scholar of literature Lars Lönnroth writes that Bellman transformed song genres including elegy and pastorales into social reportage, and that he achieved this also in his two Bacchanalian lake-journeys, epistles 25 ("Blåsen nu alla") and 48. The two are, he notes, extremely unlike in style, narrative technique, and Fredman's role in the description. Whereas epistle 25 portrays Ulla Winblad as the goddess Venus, and speaks of Neptune's court with classical mythological appurtenances like zephyrs, water-nymphs, and "all the might of Paphos" (the birthplace of Venus), Solen glimmar starts entirely naturalistically. Lönnroth notes that the subtitle explicitly states that the song paints a landscape, with the word "avmålas", "is depicted"; that the verses offer small "snapshots" of nature and country life; how Ulla is here no muse but a flesh-and-blood woman; and how the text of verse 12 actually speaks of painting a landscape. He writes that in verse 4, the factual narrative is linked to Fredman's company with an invitation to Movitz to blow his horn, Bellman's usual signal that the scene is changing; in epistle 25, the invitation to blow introduces Neptune and his entourage. In Solen glimmar, he ends the voyage with the arrival of Fredman and company at an inn where the seasick Ulla drops her skirt and climbs into bed; she is accompanied by Norström, and followed by Movitz with his bassoon, calling out to Norström that "The woman belongs to all of us". Lönnroth comments that the two epistles move the Fredman opus towards greater realism, but that this only adds to Bellman's repertoire of biblical parody and mythological rhetoric.

Carina Burman comments in her biography of Bellman that Bellman had a tendency to make humorous remarks about women's bodily functions rather than sex in his songs, as with his "[Ulla] Kröp inunder / Med ett dunder / Vände sig och log" ([Ulla] crept under [the bedclothes] / with a thunder / turned over and grinned) in Epistle 36. The first version of Epistle 48 similarly had the line "Tuppen gol och Kerstin fes" (The cockerel crowed and Kerstin farted), later replaced by "Tuppen gol så sträf och hes" (The cockerel crowed so rough and hoarse). Burman remarks that from a purely literary point of view, the change was undeniably an improvement.

Epistle 48 was one of the 20 most popular songs on Swedish school radio between 1934 and 1969, and it remained one of the pieces most often sung by Swedish teachers in the 1970s. In both cases, the Epistle was the only Bellman composition listed.

Epistle 48 has been recorded by Cornelis Vreeswijk on his 1971 album Spring mot Ulla, spring! Cornelis sjunger Bellman; by Evert Taube on his 1976 album Evert Taube Sjunger Och Berättar Om Carl Michael Bellman; and by Mikael Samuelson on his 1988 album Mikael Samuelson Sjunger Fredmans Epistlar.
The 1993 festschrift Fin(s) de Siècle in Scandinavian Perspective: Studies in Honor of Harald S. Naess is introduced with a seven-stanza song about Naess, set to the tune of the Epistle, and with some of its words, as in "Solen glimmar kring hans färd" (The sun gleams around his journey).

Notes

References

Sources

 
 
 
 
  (contains the most popular Epistles and Songs, in Swedish, with sheet music)
  (with facsimiles of sheet music from first editions in 1790, 1791)

External links 

 Text of Epistle 48 at Bellman.net
 English translation by Eva Toller

1790 compositions
Swedish songs
Fredmans epistlar
Mälaren